Catherine Larrère (nee Delafoss, born 4 August 1944) is a French philosopher and academic. She is a professor of philosophy emeritus (at Paris I - Pantheon Sorbonne). She is a specialist in Montesquieu's philosophy and an advocate for environmental ethics.

Biography
Catherine Delafoss was born in La Rochelle in 1944.

She first became interested in the history of economics, then in the philosopher Montesquieus ideas. In the 1990s, she met and was inspired by John Baird Callicott the American academic concerned  with environmental ethics. She became an expert and was an advocate for similar British and American research. She translated works by John Baird Callicott into French.

She has participated in the development of environmental philosophy, particularly in the areas of nature protection, risk prevention and environmental justice. She has written about the role of women in society as proposed by Jean-Jacques Rousseau. She collaborates with her husband, the agronomist and ecologist Raphaël Larrère.

Selected works  
 L'invention de l'économie au XVIIIe siècle : du droit naturel à la physiocratie, Paris, Puf, coll. « Léviathan », 1992. (Doctoral thesis)
 
 Du bon usage de la nature : pour une philosophie de l'environnement, with Raphaël Larrère, Paris, Aubier, coll. « Alto » 1997.
 La crise environnementale(with Raphaël Larrère), Paris, Éditions de l'INRA, 1997.
 Actualité de Montesquieu, Paris, Presses de Sciences Po, 1999.
 Lumières et commerce : l'exemple bordelais, with Jean Mondot, New York, P. Lang, 2000.
 Nature vive, Paris, Nathan-Muséum national d'histoire naturelle, 2000 .
 L'écologie est politique, with Lucile Schmid & Olivier Frossard, Les Petits matins, 2013 .
 L'éthique de la vie chez Hans Jonas, with Éric Pommier, Paris, Sorbonne Publications, 2013.
 Y a-t-il du sacré dans la nature ? (Catherine Larrère & Bérengère Hurand), Paris, Publications de la Sorbonne, 2014.
 Penser et agir avec la nature : une enquête philosophique, with Raphaël Larrère, Paris, La Découverte, 2015 .
 Les inégalités environnementales, Paris, Puf, coll. « La vie des idées », 2017 .
 Bulles technologiques, with Raphaël Larrère, Marseille, Wildproject Editions, 2017.
 Penser l'anthropocène (Catherine Larrère & Rémi Beau), Paris, Les Presses de Sciences Po, 2018.

References

1944 births
Living people
People from La Rochelle
French philosophers
20th-century French non-fiction writers
21st-century French non-fiction writers
20th-century French women writers
21st-century French women writers
Non-fiction environmental writers
Academic staff of Blaise Pascal University